William Potter Allen was a member of the Wisconsin State Assembly.

Biography
Allen was born on July 21, 1818 in New York. He died on September 1, 1901 in Sharon, Wisconsin.

Career
Allen was a member of the Assembly in 1854. He was affiliated with the Whig Party.

References

External links

The Political Graveyard

People from New York (state)
People from Sharon, Wisconsin
Members of the Wisconsin State Assembly
Wisconsin Whigs
19th-century American politicians
1818 births
1901 deaths
Burials in Wisconsin
Place of birth missing